Cleveland was abolished in 1996 both as a county council and a non-metropolitan county, but the name Cleveland continues to be used unofficially in subsequent boundary reviews as presented by the Boundary Commission for England to describe the area covered by the former county for the purpose of the rules which strongly deter cross-council constituencies (spanning more than one local authority within its area). The area covers the unitary authorities of Hartlepool, Middlesbrough, Redcar and Cleveland, and Stockton-on-Tees.   The constituency boundaries used up to the 2005 United Kingdom general election were drawn up when it was a county. The area is divided into 6 parliamentary constituencies – 5 borough constituencies and 1 county constituency.

Constituencies

2010 boundary changes

Under the Fifth Periodic Review of Westminster constituencies, the Boundary Commission for England decided to retain Cleveland's constituencies for the 2010 election, making minor changes to realign constituency boundaries with the boundaries of current local government wards and to reduce the electoral disparity between Stockton North and Stockton South.

Proposed boundary changes 
See 2023 Periodic Review of Westminster constituencies for further details.

Following the abandonment of the Sixth Periodic Review (the 2018 review), the Boundary Commission for England formally launched the 2023 Review on 5 January 2021. Initial proposals were published on 8 June 2021 and, following two periods of public consultation, revised proposals were published on 8 November 2022. Final proposals will be published by 1 July 2023.

The commission has proposed that the four unitary authorities which make up the former county of Cleveland be combined with the Borough of Darlington (previously considered with County Durham) to form a Tees Valley sub-division of the North East region. The proposals would involve Middlesbrough being renamed Middlesbrough and Thornaby East, and Stockton South renamed Stockton West. The following seats are proposed:

Containing electoral wards in Hartlepool
Hartlepool
Containing electoral wards in Middlesbrough

 Middlesbrough and Thornaby East (part)
 Middlesbrough South and East Cleveland (part)

Containing electoral wards in Redcar and Cleveland

 Middlesbrough South and East Cleveland (part)
 Redcar

Containing electoral wards in Stockton-on-Tees

 Middlesbrough and Thornaby East (part)
 Stockton North
 Stockton West (part also in Darlington)

Results history
Primary data source: House of Commons research briefing - General election results from 1918 to 2019

2019 
The number of votes cast for each political party who fielded candidates in constituencies comprising Cleveland in the 2019 general election were as follows:

Percentage votes 

11983 & 1987 - SDP-Liberal Alliance

* Included in Other

Seats 

11983 & 1987 - SDP-Liberal Alliance

Maps

Historical representation by party

See also
 List of parliamentary constituencies in the North East (region)
 History of parliamentary constituencies and boundaries in Cleveland

Notes

References

Cleveland
Parliamentary constituencies in Cleveland
Parliamentary constituencies in Cleveland